The Toyota Finance 86 Championship is a one-make sports car racing series by Toyota based in New Zealand. Toyota Finance 86 Championship cars are based on the Toyota 86(TR86).

Points system
2013–

Champions

See also
 Toyota Racing Series

References

External links
 

 
Recurring sporting events established in 2013
2013 establishments in New Zealand